Martelia tanganyicensis is a species of tropical freshwater snail with an operculum, aquatic gastropod mollusc in the family Paludomidae.

The specific name tanganyicensis is derived from the name of Lake Tanganyika.

This species is found in Burundi, the Democratic Republic of the Congo, Tanzania and Zambia.

References

Further reading 
 Bouillon J. (1955). "Sur l’anatomie et la position systématique du gastéropode thalassoide Martelia tanganyicensis Dautzenberg 1908". Revue de Zoologie et de Botanique Africaines 52: 232-240.

Paludomidae
Gastropods described in 1908
Taxonomy articles created by Polbot